Michael Delura (born 1 July 1985) is a German former professional footballer who played as a midfielder.

Early life
Born in Gelsenkirchen, Delura attended the Gesamtschule Berger Feld.

Career
Delura joined Schalke 04 when he was 14 years old and made his Bundesliga debut for Schalke 04 in 2003. He was loaned to Hannover 96 and Borussia Mönchengladbach in seasons 2005–06 and 2006–07 respectively. Delura has played more than 70 Bundesliga matches until July 2013.

Delura joined Greek club Panionios for a three-year deal on an undisclosed fee on 1 August 2007. He signed then on 4 June 2009 with Arminia Bielefeld a contract until 30 June 2011.

Delura is a former German youth international.

Career statistics

Honours
Schalke 04
 DFB-Pokal runner-up: 2004–05
 UEFA Intertoto Cup: 2004

References

External links
 
  

1985 births
Living people
German footballers
Germany youth international footballers
German expatriate footballers
German people of Polish descent
FC Schalke 04 players
FC Schalke 04 II players
Hannover 96 players
Borussia Mönchengladbach players
Panionios F.C. players
Arminia Bielefeld players
VfL Bochum players
Bundesliga players
2. Bundesliga players
Super League Greece players
Expatriate footballers in Greece
Sportspeople from Gelsenkirchen
Association football midfielders
People educated at the Gesamtschule Berger Feld
Footballers from North Rhine-Westphalia